Frederick ffoulkes Swanwick (died 1913) was a politician in Queensland, Australia. He was a Member of the Queensland Legislative Assembly.

He represented the electoral district of Bulimba from 29 November 1878 to 4 July 1882. He was previously a schoolmaster and a barrister. After becoming insolvent and being struck off the Roll of the Queensland Bar in 1882, he established a legal coaching school at his residence in Norman Park, Brisbane.  He was the first teacher at Hemmant State School, originally called Bulimba Creek School, which opened in 1864.

References

Members of the Queensland Legislative Assembly
1913 deaths
1839 births